= Stephen (Waldensian) =

Austrian bishop

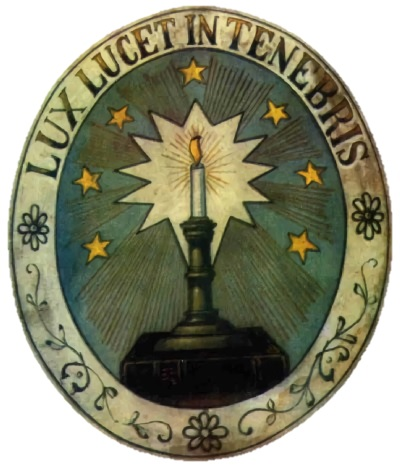
Waldensian symbol

Stephen or Stephen of Austria was a 15th century Waldensian teacher from Austria, a claimed bishop and a martyr. Stephen was burned at the stake in 1468 for charges of being a Hussite.

== Episcopacy ==
The Bohemian Brethren have claimed that Stephen as a bishop consecrated three men for the Unitas Fratrum in order to claim apostolic succession. He was said to have been ordained by a Roman bishop in 1434 but later suffered martyrdom. Though the Hussites did have good relations with Stephen, this account of him consecrating priests has been disputed.
